Malá Úpa is a municipality and village in Trutnov District in the Hradec Králové Region of the Czech Republic. It has about 100 inhabitants.

Geography
Malá Úpa lies in the Giant Mountains. It is located on the border with Poland. There is a road border crossing.

Twin towns – sister cities

Malá Úpa is twinned with:
 Kowary, Poland

References

Villages in Trutnov District